Xenophilus aerolatus is a Gram-negative, aerobic, rod-shaped and motile bacterium from the genus Xenophilus which has been isolated from air from Suwon in Korea.

Classification and diversity

Neighboring strains

Discovery

References

External links
Type strain of Xenophilus aerolatus at BacDive -  the Bacterial Diversity Metadatabase	

Comamonadaceae
Bacteria described in 2010